The Mister Europa European Player of the Year Award was an annual basketball award created in 1976, and given until 2010, by the panel of journalists of the Italian weekly magazine Superbasket. Its purpose was to praise the best basketball player with European citizenship for a given season, regardless of where he played in the world, including the NBA. The award was judged on the basis of both sports club and national team performances and accomplishments.

Like the Italian newspaper's La Gazzetta dello Sport Euroscar Award, and Eurobasket.com's All-Europe Player of the Year, it was not the official FIBA Europe Men's Player of the Year Award, which is given out by FIBA. Its legitimacy, however, stemmed from the fact that it was the oldest of all four awards, as it was created three years before the Euroscar, twenty-six years before the All-Europe Player of the Year, and twenty-nine years before the official FIBA award. Croatian small forward Toni Kukoč, holds the record for most wins with four, three of them being consecutive, a record as well.

Honor roll 

When a player was with more than one club in the calendar year of his award, all are listed.

Two players are listed as citizens of more than one country:
 Toni Kukoč is listed for 1991 as a citizen of both Yugoslavia and Croatia because Croatia declared its independence in that year.
 Peja Stojaković is listed as a citizen of both FR Yugoslavia and Serbia and Montenegro in 2002, the year of establishment of the latter entity. He also holds Greek citizenship.

See also 
 Euroscar
 FIBA Europe Men's Player of the Year Award
 FIBA Europe Young Men's Player of the Year Award
 EuroLeague MVP
 EuroLeague Final Four MVP

References

External links 
FIBAEurope.com Mr. Europa Article

Awards established in 1976
Awards disestablished in 2010
1976 establishments in Europe
European basketball awards